Liberk is a municipality and village in Rychnov nad Kněžnou District in the Hradec Králové Region of the Czech Republic. It has about 700 inhabitants.

Administrative parts
Villages of Bělá, Hláska, Prorubky, Rampuše and Uhřínov are administrative parts of Liberk.

History
The first written mention of Liberk is from 1310.

Gallery

References

Villages in Rychnov nad Kněžnou District